Jane@Music is the third studio album by Chinese singer Jane Zhang, released on January 20, 2009 by Huayi Brothers.

Track listing 
 Sound of Blooming Flowers (4:45)
 Could That Be Love? (3:57)
 Light in the Darkness (3:54)
 It's Me (3:56)
 Celebrate (4:20)
 So Hard (3:49)
 Close to You (4:27)
 Sunshine Alike (4:23)
 Eyes of Children (3:36)
 My Way (6:35)

References 

2009 albums
Jane Zhang albums